Bakhcha (Baqsa) is a rural locality (a village) in Karagushsky Selsoviet, Sterlibashevsky District, Bashkortostan, Russia. The population was 92 as of 2010. There are 2 streets.

Geography 
Bakhcha is located 16 km south of Sterlibashevo (the district's administrative centre) by road. Karagush is the nearest rural locality.

References 

Rural localities in Sterlibashevsky District